The 1976–77 NBA season was the Bullets 16th season in the NBA and their 4th season in the city of Washington, D.C.

Offseason

Draft picks

Roster

Regular season

Season standings

Notes
z, y – division champions
x – clinched playoff spot

Record vs. opponents

Playoffs

|- align="center" bgcolor="#ccffcc"
| 1
| April 13
| Cleveland
| W 109–100
| Phil Chenier (38)
| Wes Unseld (16)
| Tom Henderson (11)
| Capital Centre11,240
| 1–0
|- align="center" bgcolor="#ffcccc"
| 2
| April 15
| @ Cleveland
| L 83–91
| Phil Chenier (24)
| Elvin Hayes (23)
| Wes Unseld (5)
| Richfield Coliseum19,545
| 1–1
|- align="center" bgcolor="#ccffcc"
| 3
| April 17
| Cleveland
| W 104–98
| Tom Henderson (31)
| Elvin Hayes (15)
| Tom Henderson (6)
| Capital Centre10,488
| 2–1
|-

|- align="center" bgcolor="#ccffcc"
| 1
| April 19
| @ Houston
| W 111–101
| Mitch Kupchak (32)
| Mitch Kupchak (16)
| Tom Henderson (8)
| The Summit15,458
| 1–0
|- align="center" bgcolor="#ffcccc"
| 2
| April 21
| @ Houston
| L 118–124 (OT)
| Phil Chenier (37)
| Elvin Hayes (15)
| Tom Henderson (8)
| The Summit15,676
| 1–1
|- align="center" bgcolor="#ccffcc"
| 3
| April 24
| Houston
| W 93–90
| Mitch Kupchak (23)
| Hayes, Unseld (12)
| Tom Henderson (6)
| Capital Centre16,842
| 2–1
|- align="center" bgcolor="#ffcccc"
| 4
| April 26
| Houston
| L 103–107
| Phil Chenier (29)
| Wes Unseld (15)
| Tom Henderson (12)
| Capital Centre19,035
| 2–2
|- align="center" bgcolor="#ffcccc"
| 5
| April 29
| @ Houston
| L 115–123
| Elvin Hayes (30)
| Elvin Hayes (13)
| Wes Unseld (6)
| The Summit15,676
| 2–3
|- align="center" bgcolor="#ffcccc"
| 6
| May 1
| Houston
| L 103–108
| Phil Chenier (21)
| Wes Unseld (16)
| Tom Henderson (7)
| Capital Centre12,393
| 2–4
|-

Awards and records
Elvin Hayes, All-NBA First Team
Mitch Kupchak, NBA All-Rookie Team 1st Team

References

Washington Wizards seasons
Washington
Wash
Wash